CHMI may refer to:

CHMI-DT, a city owned-and-operated television station serving Winnipeg, Manitoba, Canada
Czech Hydrometeorological Institute, within the Environmental Ministry of the Czech Republic